Czech Art Deco, Legiobank style, National style, National decorativeness, Curved Cubism, Rondocubism or Third Cubist style is a series of terms used to describe the characteristic style of architecture and applied arts, which existed mainly during the First Czechoslovak Republic.
In the beginning, this particular style was completely neglected. Some rehabilitation has taken place since the 1950s. In the 1990s, attempts were made to place this specifically Czech style in the context of European Art Deco.

History 

Rondocubism developed after the First World War in the newly formed Czechoslovakia and became the national style for a short time, but was replaced by functionalism as early as in mid-1920s. It is characterized by the introduction of round forms such as semicircles, circles and ovals, which were intended to evoke echoes of the national Slavic traditions. Rondocubism was preferred in Prague, but was also used in industrial architecture in the surrounding area. Several rondocubist buildings were built also in Slovakia, mainly in Bratislava. The main works of architectural Rondocubism are the commercial building of the Legion Bank, or Legiobanka, by Josef Gočár and the Adria Palace by Pavel Janák in Prague.

Architecture

Prague 
Pavel Janák – Villa in Hodkovičky (1921–1922)
Josef Gočár – Legiobanka (1921–1923)
Pavel Janák – Adria Palace (1923–1924)
Ladislav Machoň – Josef and Karel Capek Villa (1923–1924)
Alois Dryák – Radiopalác (1922–1925)

Pardubice 
Pavel Janák, František Kysela – Pardubice crematorium (1921–1923)
Josef Gočár – Anglobanka (1924–1925) 
Ladislav Machoň – Machoňova Arcade (1924–1925)
Karel Řepa – Viktor Kříž Villa (1925)

Děčín 
Jaroslav Herink

Liberec 
 Franz Radetzky (1929)

Bratislava 

 Klement Šilinger – Institute of anatomy of the Faculty of Medicine of Comenius University (1925)
 František Krupka – Higschool internate (1925)
 Dušan Jurkovič – Legiodomy (1923)

Sculpture
Josef Drahoňovský
Jaroslav Horejc

Painting

Rondocubism also manifested itself in part in painting, for example by Josef Čapek, and in object design; for example, there are some complete room furnishings, by Bohumil Waigant and Josef Gočár.

Applied arts
Jindřich Halabala
František Kysela
Josef Salavec
Václav Špála

See also
Czech Cubism

Literature and sources
 POCHE, Emanuel. Prahou krok za krokem. Praha: Orbis, 1958.
 LUKEŠ, Zdeněk; PANOCH, Pavel. Století moderní architektury v Pardubickém kraji. [Pardubice]: Helios, 2006. .
 LUKEŠ, Zdeněk; PANOCH, Pavel. Ve víru modernosti. [Pardubice]: Helios, 2008. .
 LUKEŠ, Zdeněk, et al. Český architektonický kubismus : podivuhodný směr, který se zrodil v Praze. Praha: Galerie Jaroslava Fragnera, 2006. .
 SELLNEROVÁ, Alena; HANZLÍK, Jan; PAVLÍKOVÁ, Marta. Architektura Podmokel 1900 – 1945 : NPÚ, ÚOP v Ústí nad Labem, 2014.

References

Cubism
Modern art
Czech art
Art Deco architecture
Architecture in Slovakia